Number One is a 1994 Telugu-language film written and directed by S. V. Krishna Reddy. The film stars Krishna and Soundarya. The film was remade in Hindi as Daanveer with Mithun Chakraborty. The film was a megahit at the box office and was the fourth highest grossing Telugu film of the year 1994.

Cast

 Krishna as Vijay
 Soundarya
 Kota Srinivasa Rao
 Ali
 Babu Mohan
 Maharshi Raghava
 Gundu Hanumantha Rao
 Srilatha
 Sivaji Raja
 Raja Ravindra as Ravi
 Subbaraya Sharma
 Y. Vijaya
 Mahesh Anand
 Brahmanandam

Soundtrack

References

External links
 

1994 films
1990s Telugu-language films
Indian drama films
Films directed by S. V. Krishna Reddy
Films scored by S. V. Krishna Reddy
Telugu films remade in other languages